Harpooner was launched at Whitby in 1769, or possibly a few years later. Her early career is obscure. She may have been a Greenland whaler between 1786 and 1792. She appeared in Lloyd's Register in 1801, and thereafter traded across the Atlantic. She was wrecked in 1816 with heavy loss of life.

Career
Harpooner first appeared in the Register of Shipping (RS) with Krushaw, master, Richards, owner, and trade Southampton–Baltic. She was of 340 tons burthen and had undergone a good repair in 1799. However, her entry carried the annotation, "Lost".

Apparently Harpooner was not irretrievably lost as she entered Lloyd's Register (LR) in 1801 with Kneeshaw, master, Richeson, owner, and trade London–St Petersburg. She also had undergone a good repair in 1800, and now had a burthen of 370 tons. In 1802 her trade changed to London–Quebec.

On 27 June 1810 Harpooner, of Whitby, Davie, master, rescued the crew of William & Agnes. William & Agnes, W. Fernie, master, had foundered in the Atlantic Ocean at  while on her way to Quebec.

The 1816 volume of LR showed Harpooner with J. Simpson, master, changing to J. Briant, Richardson, owner, and trade London transport.

Fate
Harpooner, Bryant, master, was wrecked on 10 November 1816 at Cape Pine, Newfoundland, with the loss of 208 of the 385 people on board. She was on a voyage from Quebec City to an English port. Her passengers came from the 76th Regiment of Foot and a detachment from the 4th Veterans Battalion. There were also staff officers, and women and children.

The military records of Captain Mathew Henry Willock, of the 103rd Regiment, show that in 1817 he received a medal from His Royal Highness the Duke of Sussex and the Royal Humane Society for saving the lives of troops under lord Howard of Effingham's command on board Harpooner. Willock also received a pension of £100 per annum for life for his actions on Harpooner. (Returns of British Army Officers covering 1790s-1830's (UK National Archives WO-25-789) 21st-25th Regiments of Foot)

Notes, citations, and references
Notes

Citations

References
 
 
 The National Archives (United Kingdom)—wiki for users of The National Archives

1769 ships
Ships built in Whitby
Whaling ships
Age of Sail merchant ships of England
Maritime incidents in 1810
Maritime incidents in 1816